Hield is a surname. Notable people with the surname include:

Buddy Hield (born 1992), Bahamian basketball player
Fay Hield (born 1978), traditional English folk singer
George C. Hield (1852–1957), American businessman